Christos Mitsis (born 10 July 1980, in Maroussi) is a Greek professional football defender currently playing for  AEL 1964 in Gamma Ethniki.

References

1980 births
Living people
A.O. Kerkyra players
Kavala F.C. players
Levadiakos F.C. players
Panetolikos F.C. players
Egaleo F.C. players
Ethnikos Asteras F.C. players
Niki Volos F.C. players
PAS Giannina F.C. players
Association football fullbacks
Footballers from Athens
Greek footballers